Lake Okoboji may refer to:

West Okoboji Lake, in Iowa
East Okoboji Lake, in Iowa